BB14 may refer to:

 USS Nebraska (BB-14), a Virginia-class pre-dreadnought battleship of the United States Navy. 
 Any series of Big Brother 14
Big Brother 14 (U.S.), the 2012 edition of the United States version of Big Brother
Big Brother 14 (UK), the 2013 edition of the United Kingdom version of Big Brother
Bigg Boss (Hindi season 14), the 2020 version of Bigg Boss
Gran Hermano 14 (Spain), the 2013 edition of the Spanish version of Big Brother